Public service is a service provided (directly or indirectly) by a government to its citizens.

Public service may also refer to:

 The services provided by a public utility
 Public Service, the system of governmental departments, agencies and employees in the public sector; also called Civil service
 Public Service Corporation of New Jersey, a defunct streetcar system
 Public Service Enterprise Group, a diversified energy group internally calling itself "Public Service"
 Public service broadcasting
 Public Broadcasting Service, a US public television network (PBS)
 Public Service (EP) (1981), a compilation album by punk rock bands Redd Kross, RF7, Circle One, Bad Religion and Disability
 Public service announcement
Parks and Recreation (originally meant to be a spin-off of The Office (U.S. TV series))

See also 
 Customer service
 Community service